Aaron Robinson may refer to:

Aaron Robinson (baseball) (1915–1966), American baseball player
Aaron Robinson (composer) (born 1970), American composer
Aaron Robinson (American football) (born 1998), American football cornerback